The 2015–16 Taça da Liga was the ninth edition of the Taça da Liga, a football cup competition organized by the Liga Portuguesa de Futebol Profissional (LPFP) and contested exclusively by clubs competing in the top two professional tiers of Portuguese football. The competition was sponsored by CTT and, therefore, was known as Taça CTT.

A total of 37 teams contested this tournament, including 18 teams from the 2015–16 Primeira Liga and 19 non-reserve teams from the 2015–16 LigaPro. The competition format suffered changes relative to the previous season, with the first round (round-robin group stage) and second round (two-legged ties) being converted into single-legged knockout rounds.

Trophy holders Benfica defeated previous runners-up Marítimo in the final to extend their record in the competition to seven wins.

Format 
The competition format for the 2015–16 season consisted of three rounds followed by a knockout phase (semi-finals and final), but presents changes relative to the previous season. Nineteen teams competing in the 2015–16 LigaPro (reserve teams from Primeira Liga clubs are excluded) took part in the first round; one-legged ties were played between eighteen teams, with the nineteenth team receiving a bye to the next round.

In the second round, the ten teams advancing from the previous round (nine winners plus the team with a bye) were joined by the twelve teams placed 5th–16th in the 2014–15 Primeira Liga and by the two teams promoted to 2015–16 Primeira Liga. Again, one-legged ties were played between the twenty-four teams, with the winners advancing to the third round.

The third round featured the twelve winners of the previous round and the four best-placed teams in the 2014–15 Primeira Liga. The sixteen teams were drawn into four groups that were contested in a single round-robin format, with each team playing at least one game at home. The four group winners qualified for the semi-finals, which were played as single-legged ties. The final was played at a neutral venue.

Tiebreakers 
In the third round, teams are ranked according to points (3 points for a win, 1 point for a draw, 0 points for a loss). If two or more teams are tied on points on completion of the group matches, the following criteria are applied to determine the rankings:
highest goal difference in all group matches;
highest number of scored goals in all group matches;
lowest average age of all players fielded in all group matches (sum of the ages of all fielded players divided by the number of fielded players).

In all other rounds, teams tied at the end of regular time contest a penalty shootout to determine the winner.

Teams 
Thirty-seven teams competing in the two professional tiers of Portuguese football for the 2015–16 season were eligible to participate in this competition. For Primeira Liga teams, the final league position in the previous season determined in which round they enter the competition.

Key
Nth: League position in the 2014–15 season
P1: Promoted to the Primeira Liga
P2: Promoted to the LigaPro
R1: Relegated to the LigaPro

Schedule 
All draws were held at the LPFP headquarters in Porto, except for the draw for the first and second rounds, which took place in Loulé.

First round
The 19 non-reserve teams competing in the 2015–16 LigaPro entered the competition in this round. Eighteen teams were paired against each other for nine single-legged ties, while the nineteenth team (Famalicão) was given a bye to the next round. The draw took place on 4 July 2015, and matches were played on 1–2 August 2015.

Second round
In the second round, the nine first-round winners and Famalicão, who were given a bye to this round, joined the 12 teams ranked 5th–16th in the 2014–15 Primeira Liga and the two teams promoted from the 2014–15 Segunda Liga. These 24 teams were paired against each other into 12 single-legged ties, with the winners advancing to the next round. The draw took place on 4 July 2015, and matches were played through September and October 2015.

Third round
In the third round, the 12 second-round winners joined the four top-ranked teams from the 2014–15 Primeira Liga: Benfica (1st), Porto (2nd), Sporting CP (3rd) and Braga (4th). These 16 teams were drawn into four groups of four, each group containing one of the four top-ranked Primeira Liga teams. Group matches are played in a single round-robin format, ensuring that each team plays at least one match at home. The draw took place on 28 October 2015, 12:00 WET, and matches were played on 15 November, 28–30 December 2015, 19–20 January and 26–27 January 2016.

Group A

Group B

Group C

Group D

Knockout phase
In the knockout phase, the four teams advancing from the third round contested one-legged semi-final matches for a place in the competition final. The winners of Groups A and B host the winners of Groups C and D, respectively. The semi-finals were played on 10 February and 2 May, and the final was played on 20 May at Estádio Cidade de Coimbra, in Coimbra.

Semi-finals

Final

Notes

References

External links
 Competition page at LPFP 

Taça da Liga
Taca da Liga
Taca da Liga